Khorogochi is a rural locality (a settlement) in Khorogochinsky Selsoviet of Tyndinsky District, Amur Oblast, Russia. The population was 347 as of 2018. There are 2 streets.

Geography 
Khorogochi is located 84 km northwest  of Tynda (the district's administrative centre) by road. Kuvykta is the nearest rural locality.

References 

Rural localities in Tyndinsky District